Bryan Station (also Bryan's Station, and often misspelled Bryant's Station) was an early fortified settlement in Lexington, Kentucky. It was located on present-day Bryan Station Road, about three miles (5 km) northeast of New Circle Road, on the southern bank of Elkhorn Creek near Briar Hill Road. The settlement was established circa 1775–76 by brothers Morgan, James, William (married to Mary Boone, sister of Daniel Boone), and Joseph Bryan, and brother-in-law William Grant (married to Elizabeth Boone, also a sister of Daniel Boone), all from Yadkin River Valley, Rowan County, North Carolina, to which all the survivors returned in August 1780. The occupants of this parallelogram of some forty log cabins withstood several American Indian attacks.

Siege of Bryan Station
The most important attack on the settlement occurred in August 1782 during the American Revolutionary War, when they were besieged by a force consisting of warriors from the Wyandot, Lenape and Shawnee tribes along with a detachment of Butler's Rangers led by  Captain William Caldwell and Simon Girty. In Col. Daniel Boone's estimation, the force numbered 400–500 strong. Bryan Station was located a short distance from a spring that the camp used for drinking water.

Since the hostile forces secretly surrounding the fort did not realize that their presence was known by the defenders, the men allowed the women to exit the fort to retrieve water and other resources. The reason for this was to prevent any change in habit that could signal that the defenders were aware of the presence of the hidden force preparing to besiege them. 
Historian Ranck asserts that all the important contemporary writers convey this impression:  The Indians had no compunction attacking women, as they had done at nearby Ruddell's and Martin's Stations where even children were slaughtered two years earlier, and so the bravery of the women of Bryan Station is all the greater.

At the time of the siege, the militia did not realize just how many Indians were waiting for them outside of the fort or that these Indians had some support from the British. This attack was a surprise, and the militia in the fort were thus unprepared. The attackers lifted the siege after Indian scouts reported that a force of Kentucky militia was on the way.  The militiamen pursued Caldwell's force but were defeated three days later at the Battle of Blue Licks, about 33 miles (53 km) northeast.

Aftermath
The Lexington chapter of the Daughters of the American Revolution erected a monument in August 1896 to commemorate the importance of a nearby spring in helping preserve the fort from the attack by Indians and Canadians.  The pioneer women, led by Mary "Polly" Hawkins Craig (wife of "The Travelling Church" patriarch Toliver Craig, Sr.), fetched water from the spring to not only prevent dangerously weakening dehydration in the unusually hot summer, but also to defend against the use of burning arrows by the attackers. If the defenders had succumbed to heat exhaustion or the fort had burned, the attackers could have reached the women and children sheltering there.

A flaming arrow stuck in the cradle near the head of the infant who later became Col. Richard Mentor Johnson. Johnson would later be credited in all the earliest accounts of the War of 1812's Battle of the Thames with the slaying of Tecumseh, using a pistol loaded by his orderly Capt. Elijah Craig, who had also been present as an 18-year-old defender during the siege of Bryan Station. Located a couple of miles south of the fort's site, Bryan Station High School was named in its honor.  The athletic teams compete under the name "Defenders."

See also
 List of battles fought in Kentucky

References

 James Truslow Adams, Dictionary of American History, New York: Charles Scribner's Sons, 1940
"Outline of the Battle of Blue Licks," Carlisle Mercury, August 17, 1882, University of Kentucky Special Collections, 51W8

External links
Reuben T. Durrett, Bryant's Station and the Memorial Proceedings (Filson Club Publications 12; Louisville: Morton, 1897).
George W. Ranck, The Story of Bryan's Station: As Told in the Historical Address Delivered at Bryan's Station, Fayette County, Kentucky, August 18th, 1896 (corrected and approved ed.; Lexington, KY: Transylvania Printing, 1896).
Photos of Bryan Station Monument

Geography of Fayette County, Kentucky
Former populated places in Kentucky
American Revolutionary War sites
Battles of the American Revolutionary War in Kentucky